Bogomil Tsintsarski (Bulgarian: Богомил Цинцарски; born 14 May 1997) is a Bulgarian footballer who plays as a goalkeeper for Spartak Pleven.

Career

Vereya
Tsintsarski was sent on loan from Beroe to Vereya in January 2018, until end of the season. He made his debut for the team on 24 February 2018 in league match against Dunav Ruse. In the league match against Levski Sofia on 21 April 2018 he made 5 savings and one of them was included in the saving of the round. On 23 May 2018 it was announced that after his loan end, he and 5 others players will be released from Beroe at end of the season.

On 15 June 2018, Tsintsarski started pre-season training with Vereya.

Career statistics

Club

References

External links
 

1997 births
Living people
Bulgarian footballers
PFC Beroe Stara Zagora players
FC Vereya players
FC Minyor Radnevo players
First Professional Football League (Bulgaria) players
Association football goalkeepers
Sportspeople from Las Vegas